St. Jerome in the Desert is a  egg tempera on wood painting by Giovanni Bellini, now in the Barber Institute of Fine Arts in Birmingham, England.

Universally recognised as Bellini's earliest surviving work, painted when he was around 16, it depicts Saint Jerome shown semi-naked seated on a rock in front of his cave in the Syrian Desert with a book in his left hand, referring to his life as a hermit and as the producer of the Vulgate Bible, and his faithful lion in front of him. The saint appears in the gesture of giving him a blessing, while the lion still has the famous thorn on his paw, which according to the legend was removed by Jerome.

References

Paintings by Giovanni Bellini
Paintings in the collection of the Barber Institute of Fine Arts
1450 paintings
Books in art
Lions in art
Bellini